The Catacomb culture was a Bronze Age culture which flourished on the Pontic steppe in 2500–1950 BC.

Originating on the southern steppe as an outgrowth of the Yamnaya culture, the Catacomb culture came to cover a large area. It was probably Indo-European-speaking. Influences of the Catacomb culture have been detected as far as Mycenaean Greece. It spawned the Multi-cordoned ware culture and was eventually succeeded by the Srubnaya culture.

Origins
The Catacomb culture emerged on the southern part of the Pontic steppe in 2500 BC, as a western descendant of the Yamnaya culture. Influences from the west appear to have had a decisive role on the formation of the Catacomb culture.

In addition to the Yamnaya culture, the Catacomb culture displays links with the earlier Sredny Stog culture, the Afanasievo culture and the Poltavka culture.

Distribution

The Catacomb culture was distributed on the Pontic steppe, an area that had earlier been occupied by the Yamnaya culture. This was a large area, and on the basis of ceramic styles and burial practices, regional variants have been found. On this basis, the Catacomb culture has by some been designated as a "cultural-historical area" with the regional variants classified as distinct cultures in their own respect.

In the east the Catacomb culture neighbored the Poltavka culture, which was an eastern descendant of the Yamnaya culture. The Catacomb culture influenced the development of the Poltavka culture. Throughout its existence, the Catacomb culture expanded eastward and northward.

Elena Efimovna Kuzmina suggests that the Seima-Turbino phenomenon emerged as a result of interaction between the Abashevo culture, the Catacomb culture and the early Andronovo culture.

Evidence of Catacomb influence has been discovered far outside of the Pontic steppe. Its burial chambers, metal types and figurines are very similar to those appearing in Italy and the eastern Mediterranean, while the hammer-head pin, a characteristic ornament of the Catacomb culture, has been found in Central Europe and Italy. Based on these similarities, migrations or cultural diffusion from the Catacomb culture to these areas have been suggested. Similarities between the Catacomb culture and Mycenaean Greece are particularly striking. These include types of socketed spear-heads, types of cheekpieces for horses, and the custom of making masks for the dead.

Characteristics

Burials
The Catacomb culture is named for its burials. These augmented the shaft grave of the Yamnaya culture with burial niche at its base. This is the so-called catacomb. Such graves have also been found in Mycenaean Greece and parts of Eastern Europe.

Deceased Catacomb individuals were typically buried in a flexed position on their right side. They were often accompanied by ornaments such as silver rings, and weapons such as stone and metal axes, arrows, daggers and maces.

Animal sacrifices, including head and hooves of goats, sheep, horses and cattle, occur in about 16% of Catacomb graves. Cattle sacrifices in the Catacomb culture are more frequent than in the Yamnaya culture. Similar horse burials also appeared in the earlier Khvalynsk culture, and in the Poltavka culture.

Catacomb burials are occasionally covered with Kurgan stelae. This practice was also common in the Yamnaya culture. Some three hundred stelae have been found from the Yamnaya culture and the Catacomb culture.

Catacomb burials are sometimes accompanied by wheeled vehicles. Such wagon burials are attested in the earlier Yamnaya culture, and later among Iranian peoples (Scythians), Celts, and Italic peoples.

Aspects of the burial rite of the Catacomb culture have been detected in the Bishkent culture of southern Tajikistan.

In some cases, the skull of deceased Catacomb people was modelled in clay. This involved the filling of the mouth, ears and nasal cavity with clay and modeling the surface features of the face. This practice is associated with high-status burials containing prestige items. The practice was performed on men, women, and children. It has been suggested that these clay masks may have served as a prototype for the later gold masks found in Mycenaean Greece.

Economy

The economy of the Catacomb culture has been based mostly on stockbreeding. Remains of cattle, sheep, goat, horse and some pigs have been found. Plant remains are exceedingly rare, but traces of wheat, such as einkorn and emmer, have been found. Wooden ploughs have been found at Catacomb burials, indicating that agriculture was practiced.

The types of tools used by the Catacomb people suggest that the culture included several craft specialists, including weavers, bronze workers and weapons manufacturers. Similar metal types to those of the Catacomb culture later appears among the Abashevo culture.

Settlements

Little evidence of Catacomb settlements has been found. These are mostly seasonal camp-sites located near sources of water.

A larger settlement has been found at Matveyevka on the southern Bug. It has three large structures with foundations of stone. On the island of Bayda in the Dnieper river, a stone-built fortress of the late Catacomb period with a surrounding ditch has been found.

Ceramics

Catacomb ceramics are more elaborate than those of the Yamnaya culture. Low footed vessels that have been discovered in female burials are believed to have been used in rituals that included the use of narcotic substances such as hemp.

Catacomb ceramics appears to have influenced the ceramics of the Abashevo culture and the Sintashta culture.

Weapons

Evidence of early composite bows have been yielded from the Catacomb culture. Quivers with space for ten to twenty arrows have also been found. Its arrowheads may have influenced those of the Sintashta culture.

Its hollow-based flint arrowheads are similar to those of the Middle Dnieper culture. Stone battle-axes of the Catacomb culture are similar to those of the Fatyanovo–Balanovo culture.

A knife from ca. 2500 BC ascribed to the Catacomb culture in the Donets had a handle of arsenical bronze and a blade made of iron.

Other characteristics
Wheeled vehicles have been found in Catacomb burials.

Bronze warty beads of the Catacomb culture are similar to those of the Sintashta culture.

Certain variants of the Catacomb culture, particularly those centered at the Donets, appear to have practiced cranial deformation. This may have been an aesthetic device or an ethnic marker. Around 9% of Catacomb skulls had holes drilled into them. This appears to have been associated with a ritual or medical practice.

Remains of bears have been found at Catacomb sites.

Demographics
The Catacomb culture is estimated to have included some 50,000-60,000 individuals.

Physical type
The Catacomb people were massively built Caucasoids/Europoids. Their skulls are similar to those of the Potapovka culture. Potapovka skulls are less dolichocephalic than those of the Fatyanovo–Balanovo culture, Abashevo culture, Sintashta culture, Srubnaya culture and Andronovo culture. The physical type of the Potapovka appears to have emerged through a mixture between the strongly dolichocephalic type of the Sintashta, and the less dolichocephalic type of the Yamnaya culture and Poltavka culture.

The people of the Catacomb culture have been described as "stockier and had more  brachycephalic crania" than individuals belonging to the Yamnaya culture. According to two craniological studies, "the Catacomb culture skulls supposedly showed Mediterranean features, indicating their possible migration into the region from the Armenian Highland and the Caucasus."

Genetics

Pashnik et al. (2014) analyzed the DNA of the remains of 28 Catacomb individuals. Their maternal haplogroups U5 and U4 appeared in higher frequencies than in the preceding Yamnaya culture. Haplogroups U5 and U4 are typical of Western Hunter-Gatherers and Eastern Hunter-Gatherers. Moreover, a generic similarity between Catacomb people and northern hunter-gatherers, particularly the people of the Pitted Ware culture of southern Scandinavia, was detected. It was suggested that the Catacomb people and the Yamnaya people were not as genetically admixed as previously believed. Interestingly, the modern population of Ukraine was found to be more closely related to people of the Yamnaya culture than people of the Catacomb culture.

Similarly, Nikitin et al. (2017), and Juras et al. (2018) found haplogroup U5 and U5a. These and other subclades of haplogroup U have been found in high frequencies among early hunter-gatherers of Northern Europe and Eastern Europe. From the Mesolithic they appear among populations of the Pontic steppe, including the Sredny Stog culture, the Yamnaya culture, the Corded Ware culture, the Andronovo culture, the Srubnaya culture and the Scythians. This suggests continuity of mtDNA among populations of the Pontic steppe going back at least to the Bronze Age.

In a genetic study published in Scientific Reports in 2018, the remains of two individuals from the Catacomb culture were analyzed.  Both were found to belong to haplogroup X4. They are the first ancient individuals that have been identified with this lineage, which is very rare among modern populations.

In a February 2019 study published in Nature Communications, the remains of five individuals ascribed to the Catacomb culture were analyzed. Three males were found to be carrying R1b1a2. With regards to mtDNA, all five individuals carried various subclades of haplogroup U (particularly U5 and U4).

Linguistics
David Anthony (2007: 306) assumes that the Catacomb culture was Indo-European-speaking. It has sometimes been considered ancestral to Indo-Iranian or Thracian. Other scholars have suggested that the culture provided a common background for Greek, Armenian and Indo-Iranian.

Successors
The Srubnaya culture was a successor of the Catacomb culture. It has been suggested that the Abashevo culture was partially derived from the Catacomb culture. Parts of the area of the Catacomb culture came to be occupied by the Abashevo culture, and later by the Srubnaya culture. The Multi-cordoned ware culture was an eastern successor of the Catacomb culture. It in turn may have played a role in the emergence of the Potapovka culture and the Sintashta culture, and thus on the formation of the Andronovo culture. Morphological data suggests that the Sintashta culture might have emerged as a result of a mixture of steppe ancestry from the Poltavka culture and Catacomb culture, with ancestry from Neolithic forest hunter-gatherers.

See also

 Dnieper-Donets culture

Notes

References

Bibliography

External links

Archaeological cultures of Eastern Europe
Indo-European archaeological cultures
Bronze Age cultures of Europe
Archaeological cultures in Ukraine
Archaeological cultures in Russia
Archaeology of Kuban